Samdrup Jongkhar District (Dzongkha: བསམ་གྲུབ་ལྗོངས་མཁར་རྫོང་ཁག་; Wylie: Bsam-grub Ljongs-mkhar rdzong-khag) is one of the 20 dzongkhags (districts) comprising Bhutan. The dominant languages of the district are Tshangla (Sharchopkha) in the north and west, and Nepali in the east. It covers a total area of 1878 sq km. Samdrup dzongkhag comprises two dungkhags: Jhomotsangkha and Samdrupchhoeling, and 11 gewogs.

Administrative divisions
Samdrup Jongkhar District is divided into eleven village groups (or gewogs):

Dewathang Gewog
Gomdar Gewog
Langchenphu Gewog
Lauri Gewog
Martshala Gewog
Orong Gewog
Pemathang Gewog
Phuntshothang Gewog
Samrang Gewog
Serthi Gewog
Wangphu Gewog

Protected areas
Samdrup Jongkhar contains protected areas. Southeastern Samdrup Jongkhar District (the gewogs of Langchenphu, Pemathang, Samrang and Serthi) contains Khaling Wildlife Sanctuary, which is connected via biological corridors to Sakteng Wildlife Sanctuary to the north (Trashigang District) and Royal Manas National Park to the west (several districts). A small portion of northern Lauri Gewog is part of the Sakteng Wildlife Sanctuary.

See also
Districts of Bhutan
Kurmaed Province

References

External links

 
Districts of Bhutan